Kyaukpyu Township is a township of Kyaukpyu District in the Rakhine State of Myanmar. The principal town is Kyaukpyu.

At Ma Day Island of Kyaukpyu Township, a deep sea port was being built by Aisa World Company by investment of China National Petroleum Corporation.

Kyaukphyu Special Economic Zone

The Kyaukpyu SEZ plan is included an industrial zone, residential housing estates and a deep-water port and to cover about  near Sit Taw and Si Maw Village.  roadway and railway will linked between SEZ and Yunnan Province of China. But it will be relocated near to Kani Village because of finding an active mud volcano in initially planned area. Nippon Koei, China's CITIC group and Burma's Htoo Trading are expected to investment this project. CPG Consultancy Ltd., a Singaporean company, is appointed as adviser in selection of investment proposals.

Shwe Gas Project
It is one of the Burma's largest natural gas projects. A USD 3 billion gas pipeline and onshore tanker terminal project was built by Daewoo, China National Petroleum Corporation and Burma's state-owned Myanmar Oil and Gas Enterprise. It can pump about 12 billion cubic meters of gas annually to Kunming, Yunnan Province of China. It is planned to pump 22 million tonnes of crude oil annually. The dual oil and gas pipelines run over from Kyaukpyu to Kunming.

See also
Sino-Burma pipelines

References

External links
Ramree Island Business and Travel News
Kyauk Phyu Special Economic Zone

Townships of Rakhine State